An address is a collection of information used to give the location of a building or a plot of land.

Address or The Address may also refer to:

 The Address (film), a 2014 film by Ken Burns

Buildings
 Address Boulevard, a hotel in Dubai 
 Address Downtown, a hotel in Dubai

Computing
, an HTML element
An (often-virtual) location in an address space which corresponds to a logical or physical entity

Other uses
 Public speaking, the process of speaking to a group of people in a structured, deliberate manner
 Style (manner of address), a legal, official, or recognized title
 In golf, to line up the club with the ball

See also
 
 Addressee (disambiguation)
 Term of address (disambiguation)